Olga Lyudvigovna Della-Vos-Kardovskaya (1875, Chernigov, Russian Empire – 1952, Leningrad, USSR) was a Russian painter and graphic artist.  From 1891 until 1894 she studied at the Schneider School in Kharkov; from 1894 to 1899 she was a student at the Academy in Saint Petersburg.  She went to Munich to study at Anton Ažbe's school, staying there from 1899 to 1900.  In 1900 she married painter Dmitry Kardovsky. Her Mother, Mariya Della-Vos was a Bulgarian from Odessa and member of the Toshkovic family and daughter of Stefan Toshkovich and sister from Nikola Toshkovich.

Between 1903 and 1917 she exhibited with the New Society of Artists; from 1911 until 1916 she also exhibited with the Union of Russian Artists.  She was associated with the Zhar-tsvet group from 1924 to 1928.  She was included in a large 1927 exhibit in Moscow commemorating the tenth anniversary of the Russian Revolution.

Works

References

Further reading

 John Milner.  A Dictionary of Russian and Soviet Artists, 1420 – 1970.  Woodbridge, Suffolk; Antique Collectors' Club, 1993

1875 births
1952 deaths
Painters from the Russian Empire
Graphic artists from the Russian Empire
People from Chernihiv
Soviet painters
Soviet graphic artists